Grandal is a surname. Notable people with the surname include:

 Iria Grandal (born 1990), Spanish archer
 Yasmani Grandal (born 1988), Cuban-American baseball player

See also
 Grandall Law Firm, Beijing